Răducanu Necula (born 10 May 1946), widely known as Rică Răducanu, is a retired Romanian football goalkeeper.

Club career

Rică Răducanu, nicknamed Tamango after the character played by Alex Cressan from the 1958 movie, Tamango was born on 18 May 1946 in Vlădeni, Ialomița, but grew up in the Giulești neighborhood from Bucharest and started to play football in 1958 in the offence at Victoria MIBC București, later moving to Divizia C club, Flacăra Roșie București where coach Sandu Frățilă started using him as a goalkeeper, giving him his senior debut in a 1–0 victory from the 1963–64 Cupa României against Divizia A club, Progresul București in which he saved a penalty from Nicolae Oaidă. He was seen by Rapid Bucuresti's coach, Valentin Stănescu who brought him at the team from Giulești, giving him his Divizia A debut on 8 May 1966 in a 2–1 home loss against Siderurgistul Galați. In the following season, Stănescu used Răducanu in 24 Divizia A games, helping the club win the first title from its history. He also won two Cupa României in 1972 and 1975 and took part in Rapid's 1971–72 UEFA Cup campaign, playing all six games, as the team reached the eight-finals, eliminating Napoli and Legia Warsaw, being eliminated by the team who would eventually win the competition, Tottenham, also taking part in the 1972–73 European Cup Winners' Cup campaign, playing all six games, helping the team reach the quarter-finals, eliminating Landskrona BoIS and Rapid Wien, being eliminated by Leeds United who reached the final. The following day after the 5–0 away loss against Leeds, the team had a meeting with the club's officials at which writer Eugen "Jean" Barbu who was also at the game participated and he criticized the team for not having the devotion and the spirit of sacrifice as the English players, at one point talking directly to Răducanu who replied with a rhetorical question:"Well come on, Mr. Jean, do you write like Shakespeare?". Răducanu was also a goalscoring goalkeeper, scoring three goals from penalty kicks in the 1973–74 Divizia A season against CFR Cluj, Politehnica Iași and Politehnica Timișoara, also in the same season he became the first goalkeeper from Romanian football that was caught in offside in a game against Farul Constanța, however the team relegated at the end of that season, but he stayed with the club, scoring another four penalty goals in 30 appearances and helping it promote back to the first division after one year. In the following season he left Rapid after 10 seasons spent at the club and went to play for Sportul Studențesc București for three seasons where in the 1976–77 UEFA Cup he scored a goal from a penalty kick against Olympiacos, helping the team reach the next phase of the competition. In 1978, his friend, Nicu Ceaușescu who was the son of dictator Nicolae Ceaușescu, bought him to Steaua București where he helped the team win the 1978–79 Cupa României. Afterwards he spent a short period at Divizia B team, FCM Reșița, being brought back to Divizia A by coach Viorel Mateianu at FC Baia Mare where he didn't adapt, playing only 10 games in Divizia A, including his last appearance in the competition which took place on 18 October 1980 in a 3–1 away loss in front of Politehnica Timișoara. Răducanu ended his career playing in the Romanian lower leagues at Autobuzul București, Spartac București and Voința Crevedia, also he came out of retirement at Senaco Novaci where he played for a few years, completely ending his career in 2003 at age 57. Rică Răducanu was a goalkeeper known for his great saves, but also for his big mistakes and for his joy of entertaining the public with his juggling abilities, having a total of 329 games played with 3 goals scored in Divizia A, also having a total of 26 matches in which he scored one goal in European competitions (including 3 games in the Inter-Cities Fairs Cup).

International career
Rică Răducanu played 56 games for Romania in which he conceded 54 goals, making his debut under coach Angelo Niculescu on 25 June 1967 in a 1–0 home loss against Italy at the Euro 1968 qualifiers. He played four games at the successful 1970 World Cup qualifiers, being used by Angelo Niculescu in the 3–2 loss against Brazil from the final tournament when he replaced Stere Adamache in the 29th minute and conceded a goal from Pelé. He played 9 matches at the 1972 Euro qualifiers, managing to reach the quarter-finals where Romania was defeated by Hungary, who advanced to the final tournament. Răducanu went on to play six games at the Euro 1976 qualifiers, appeared in two matches at the 1973–76 Balkan Cup, three at the 1977–80 Balkan Cup and made his last appearance for the national team on 25 October 1978 in a 3–2 home victory against Yugoslavia at the Euro 1980 qualifiers.

For representing his country at the 1970 World Cup, Răducanu was decorated by President of Romania Traian Băsescu on 25 March 2008 with the Ordinul "Meritul Sportiv" – (The Medal "The Sportive Merit") class III.

Personal life
Rică Răducanu was well known for his charisma, being invited in numerous Romanian TV shows, also being an occasional film actor playing in the 1978 Totul pentru fotbal (Everything for football) directed by Andrei Blaier and in the 2008 Legiunea străină (The foreign legion) directed by Mircea Daneliuc, both comedy films. After the 1989 Romanian Revolution he had for a while his own grocery store called Merci Rică in the Drumul Taberei neighborhood from Bucharest and a luxury terrace in the Neptun summer resort, by the sea called Sirena (The mermaid). Folk singer, Victor Socaciu composed a song dedicated to him called Portar sub Podul Grant (Goalkeeper under the Grant Bridge) and a book about him was written by Sorin Satmari called Rică Răducanu sau prea mare pentru un careu atât de mic (Rică Răducanu or too big for such a small penalty box). In May 2008, mayor of Bucharest, Adriean Videanu awarded Răducanu the Honorary Citizen of Bucharest title. His son Cătălin Necula was also a footballer.

Honours
Rapid București
Divizia A: 1966–67
Divizia B: 1974–75
Cupa României: 1971–72, 1974–75
Steaua București
Cupa României: 1978–79

Notes

References

External links

1946 births
Living people
People from Ialomița County
Romanian footballers
Olympic footballers of Romania
Romania international footballers
Liga I players
Liga II players
CS Minaur Baia Mare (football) players
FC Steaua București players
FC Rapid București players
FC Sportul Studențesc București players
CSM Reșița players
AFC Rocar București players
Association football goalkeepers
1970 FIFA World Cup players